Little River railway station is located on the Warrnambool line in Victoria, Australia. It serves the town of Little River, and it opened on 1 January 1857. It was renamed Bulban on 2 May 1910, and was renamed Little River 9 December 1912.

History

When the Geelong and Melbourne Railway Company constructed the line, it proposed that the station be built on the northern side of Little River. However, the company had trouble negotiating with the relevant land owner, so the first station was located on the south side of the river. The former platform mound of that station was finally removed in 1994, when the Western standard gauge line was being constructed.

The buildings and adjoining goods shed of the current station, on the north side of the river, are some of the earliest station buildings in Victoria. They are constructed of bluestone, to an original design by Frederick Kawerau, for the Geelong and Melbourne Railway Company, and were completed by the Victorian Railways in 1864. Features of note include the basement holding cells and the Victorian Railways plaques on the station gables. The buildings layouts have changed over the years, as shown in the State Library Drawings (see external links below), and they are listed on the Victorian Heritage Register.

On 25 October 1970, the newly duplicated the line from Werribee to Little River was opened, and the goods siding closed. In 1972, a crossover at the Up end of the station was abolished. On 4 June 1981, the newly duplicated line to Lara was opened, and a second platform (Platform 1) was provided.

In 1995, the Western standard gauge line opened, passing to the north and west of the station. The line is primarily used by freight trains, as well as The Overland passenger service to and from Adelaide. However, it does not stop at the station.

In 2010, the goods shed had started to crumble. Infrastructure owner VicTrack conducted an inspection of the shed, which revealed its doors and windows had been forced open, and, in liaison with the lessee V/Line, VicTrack undertook work to ensure the shed was secured as quickly as possible from further damage.

Disused station Werribee Racecourse is located between Little River and Werribee, as was the now-demolished station Manor.

In music
Little River Band included some scenes shot at Little River station in the music video for their 1978 single, Shut Down Turn Off.

Platforms and services

Little River has two side platforms. It is serviced by V/Line Geelong line and selected Warrnambool line services.

Platform 1:
 services to Southern Cross

Platform 2:
 services to Geelong, South Geelong, Marshall and Waurn Ponds
 one weekend morning service to Warrnambool

References

External links
Victorian Railway Stations gallery
Melway map at street-directory.com.au
State Library Drawings: https://viewer.slv.vic.gov.au/?entity=IE7598153&mode=browse
State Library Drawings: https://viewer.slv.vic.gov.au/?entity=IE7597082&mode=browse

Railway stations in Australia opened in 1857
Regional railway stations in Victoria (Australia)
Railway stations in the City of Wyndham
Listed railway stations in Australia
Heritage-listed buildings in Melbourne